Reaping typically refers to the cutting of grain or pulse for harvest.

Reaping may also refer to:

 The Reaping, a 2007 horror film
 The Reaping (audio drama), a Big Finish Productions audio drama based on the television series Doctor Who
 Reaper, also "reaping machine", a farm tool or machine for harvesting grain
 Sickle, also "reaping-hook", a curved-blade agriculture tool typically used for harvesting

See also
Reap (disambiguation)
Reaper (disambiguation)